Sweet Giant of the Blues is an album by blues pianist and vocalist Otis Spann recorded in New York in 1969 and released by the BluesTime label.

Reception

AllMusic reviewer Stephen Thomas Earlewine stated "Sweet Giant of the Blues, a 1969 session for Bluestime released in 1970, is one of his very last albums and if it can't be called definitive, it's nevertheless a robust example of his gifts.  ... This is loose and unpredictable in a predictable fashion, delving into a little bit of Latin beats and rhumba and a whole lot of rock & roll ... Spann seems to seize the changes and enjoys playing with the band, never trying to play against his support".

Track listing
All compositions by Otis Spann except where noted
 "Got My Mojo Working" (McKinley Morganfield) − 3:03
 "Sellin' My Thing" − 7:23
 "Moon Blues" (Bob Thiele, George David Weiss) − 4:26
 "I'm a Dues Payin' Man" (Jim Rein) − 3:10
 "I Wonder Why" − 4:22
 "Bird in a Cage" − 6:06
 "Hey Baby" − 5:38
 "Make a Way" − 4:23

Personnel
Otis Spann − vocals, piano
Tom Scott − tenor saxophone, flute
Louie Shelton − guitar
Max Bennett − bass
Paul Humphrey − drums
Mike Anthony − banjo, guitar (tracks 1, 3, 4 & 8)

References

1970 albums
Otis Spann albums
Flying Dutchman Records albums
Albums produced by Bob Thiele